Annamanum is a genus of longhorn beetles of the subfamily Lamiinae, containing the following species:

 Annamanum albisparsum (Gahan, 1888)
 Annamanum albomaculatum (Breuning, 1935)
 Annamanum alboplagiatum Breuning, 1966
 Annamanum annamanum Breuning, 1960
 Annamanum annulicorne (Pic, 1934)
 Annamanum basigranulatum Breuning, 1970
 Annamanum cardoni Breuning, 1953
 Annamanum chebanum (Gahan, 1895)
 Annamanum fuscomaculatum Breuning, 1979
 Annamanum griseolum (Bates, 1884)
 Annamanum griseomaculatum Breuning, 1936
 Annamanum guerryi (Pic, 1903)
 Annamanum humerale (Pic, 1934)
 Annamanum indicum Breuning, 1938
 Annamanum irregulare (Pic, 1925)
 Annamanum lunulatum (Pic, 1934)
 Annamanum mediomaculatum Breuning, 1962
 Annamanum ochreopictum Breuning, 1969
 Annamanum plagiatum (Aurivillius, 1913)
 Annamanum rondoni Breuning, 1962
 Annamanum sikkimense Breuning, 1942
 Annamanum sinicum Gressitt, 1951
 Annamanum strandi Breuning, 1938
 Annamanum subauratum Breuning, 1957
 Annamanum subirregulare Breuning, 1950
 Annamanum szetschuanicum Breuning, 1947
 Annamanum thoracicum (Gahan, 1895)
 Annamanum touzalini Breuning, 1979
 Annamanum yunnanum Breuning, 1947

References

 
Lamiini